Carbasea is a genus of bryozoans in the family Flustridae.

References 

 15. Observations on Carbasea indivisa Busk (Bryozoa). Leo W. Stach, Journal of Zoology, Volume B108, Issue 3
October 1938, pages 389–399,

External links 

 
 WoRMS

Bryozoan genera
Cheilostomatida